Clivina diluta is a species of ground beetle in the subfamily Scaritinae. It was described by Darlington in 1953.

References

diluta
Beetles described in 1953